Kitty Play is a New Jersey based record label formed in late 2003. The label's acts covers a wide variety of genres from straightforward rock music to abrasive noise. The label returned from hiatus in the spring of 2010 with a new full-length LP by San Diego underground band Kill Me Tomorrow.

Bands 
 2673
 AIDS Wolf
 An Albatross
 Antennacle
 Athletic Automaton
 Bastard Noise
 Burden Brothers
 The Cherry Point
 The Chinese Stars
 Current Amnesia
 Dead Machines
 Aaron Dilloway
 Door
 Kevin Drumm
 King Darves
 Fossils
 Joshua David Hydeman
 Kill Me Tomorrow
 Ladderwoe
 Mr. California
 Newton
 Panicsville
 Pictureplane
 Duane Pitre / Pilotram
 Jessica Rylan
 Scientific Explanation of Despair
 The Supersuckers
 Talibam
 Twodeadsluts Onegoodfuck
 Unicorn
 John Wiese

See also
 List of record labels

External links
 Official MySpace site
 Partial Discography
 
 

Record labels established in 2003
American independent record labels
Noise music record labels